Songs for Midi is the third EP by producer Kwes. It was released on 5 April 2018, on Warp.

Track listing

References

External links
Songs for Midi at Discogs.com
Songs for MIDI at Warp Records
Music video for "Blox/Connor" by Kwes

Kwes albums
2018 EPs
Warp (record label) albums
Albums produced by Kwes